The following is a list of notable vibraphone players in jazz or classical music:

A

B

C

D

E

F

G

H

J

K

L

M

N

P

R

S

T

U

V

W

Z

Further reading

Vibraphone